Giovanni Battista Pinello di Ghirardi (born in Genoa c. 1544 – died in Prague on 15 June 1587) was an Italian music composer and Kapellmeister of the Italian Renaissance.

Giovanni Battista Pinello came from a noble Genoese family. He worked first as a singer in Vicenza, from the 1570s at the Innsbrucker Hof, then in Prague at the court of Holy Roman Emperor Rudolf II. A few months after the death of Antonio Scandello, he was appointed Kapellmeister to the Staatskapelle Dresden in 1581. Because of disagreements, he soon had to give up this post and settled again in Prague. Pinello was one of the composers who brought the Italian style into the German-speaking world.

Johann Gottfried Walther mentioned in his Musicalisches Lexicon published in 1732 the following compositions by Pinello:

A four-part mass (1583)
Ein deutsches Magnificat in den acht Kirchentönen (1584) – a German Magnificat in the eight church tones *Cantiones Sacrae and madrigals for eight, ten and fifteen voices (Dresden, 1584)
Neue deutsche Lieder zu fünf Stimmen (Dresden, 1585) – New German songs to five voices held in the style of the Neapolitan villanella transferred from the Italian
Napolitane a cinque voci (Dresden, 1585) – in five voices
Motetii quinque vocum (1588)
18 five-part Motets (Prague 1588)

Biography
Moritz Fürstenau: Pinelli de Gerardis, Giovanni Baptista. In Allgemeine Deutsche Biographie (ADB).  Vol. 26, Duncker & Humblot, Leipzig 1888, p. 150.

References

16th-century Italian composers
Austrian composers
Czech composers
Czech male composers
16th-century German composers
Renaissance composers
Sacred music composers
Musicians from Genoa
1540s births
1587 deaths
Year of birth uncertain